Hlusk District (Glussky raion) is a raion (district) in Mogilev Region, Belarus, the administrative center is the urban-type settlement of Hlusk. As of 2009, its population was 16,457. Population of Hlusk accounts for 45.0% of the district's population.

References

 
Districts of Mogilev Region